Akçatoprak is a neighbourhood in the Horasan District of Erzurum Province in Turkey.

References

Villages in Horasan District